Desert Aire is a census-designated place (CDP) in Grant County, Washington, United States. The population was 1,626 at the 2010 census, up from 1,124 at the 2000 census.

Geography
Desert Aire is located near the southwest corner of Grant County at  (46.685121, -119.924811), on the east bank of the Columbia River where it is part of Priest Rapids Lake. To the southeast SR 243 leads  to SR 24 at the Vernita Bridge over the Columbia.

The CDP extends out to the middle of the Columbia River, where it is bordered by Yakima County to the west.

History
In the late 1960s, a group of investors led by Harry Davidson, of Harry Davidson, Inc., bought  of land along the Columbia River near the Priest Rapids Dam for some $1,000,000. Davidson cut in a runway and flew investors into his airport community in a Douglas DC-3. They developed a planned community of some 1,600 homes centered on the airport, a golf course and marina, which opened beginning in 1970. In 1994 the Grant County Airport District #1 was formed and now maintains the regional public-use airport in the community.

Climate
Desert Aire has some of the hottest temperatures in Washington during the summer and is one of the driest places in the state, being located in the rain shadow of both the Cascades and the Umtanums.

Demographics
As of the census of 2000, there were 1,124 people, 371 households, and 296 families residing in the CDP. The population density was 344.0 people per square mile (132.7/km2). There were 723 housing units at an average density of 221.3/sq mi (85.4/km2). The racial makeup of the CDP was 64.50% White, 0.18% African American, 0.18% Native American, 0.62% Asian, 30.96% from other races, and 3.56% from two or more races. Hispanic or Latino of any race were 46.89% of the population.

There were 371 households, out of which 35.3% had children under the age of 18 living with them, 70.4% were married couples living together, 4.9% had a female householder with no husband present, and 20.2% were non-families. 16.7% of all households were made up of individuals, and 6.7% had someone living alone who was 65 years of age or older. The average household size was 3.03 and the average family size was 3.35.

In the CDP, the age distribution of the population shows 31.2% under the age of 18, 7.0% from 18 to 24, 25.4% from 25 to 44, 21.4% from 45 to 64, and 14.9% who were 65 years of age or older. The median age was 32 years. For every 100 females, there were 107.0 males. For every 100 females age 18 and over, there were 112.4 males.

The median income for a household in the CDP was $35,719, and the median income for a family was $36,971. Males had a median income of $25,417 versus $20,188 for females. The per capita income for the CDP was $18,719. About 4.9% of families and 6.5% of the population were below the poverty line, including 9.1% of those under age 18 and none of those age 65 or over.

Media portrayal
The band the Dark Fantastic references Desert Aire in the title of the song "Incident at Desert Aire". The lyrics, however, make no mention of the place.

References

External links
 www.desertaire.com

Census-designated places in Grant County, Washington
Census-designated places in Washington (state)
Washington (state) populated places on the Columbia River